"The Battle of Armageddon" is a hymn written by Roy Acuff and Odell McLeod.  It warns of the coming Judgment Day and references the Book of Revelation.  The song became associated with Hank Williams when MGM Records released it as a posthumous single.  Between January and May 1949, Williams had pre-recorded early morning radio shows for Johnnie Fair Syrup, and MGM issued several songs from the surviving acetates as singles to satisfy the unyielding demand product by the late country singer, who was quickly becoming a mythic figure in country music. Co-writer Roy Acuff had been a primary influence on Williams' music.  Williams pronounces "Armageddon" as "Am-be-gotten" and usually ignored his producer Fred Rose's demands that he enunciate his words with more sophistication.

Discography

References

Hank Williams songs
Songs written by Roy Acuff
1949 songs